Ismail Fahd Ismail or Ismāʿīl Fahd Ismāʿīl (1940 – 25 September 2018). was a Kuwaiti novelist, short story writer, and literary critic. He was acclaimed as the finest and most prolific writer in the history of Kuwait, with over twenty novels and numerous short story collections and publications.

His novel Al-Sabiliat was shortlisted for the 2017 International Prize for Arabic Fiction.

References

1940 births
2018 deaths
Kuwaiti literary critics
Kuwaiti novelists
Kuwaiti short story writers